Tirathaba catharopa is a species of moth of the family Pyralidae. It was described by Alfred Jefferis Turner in 1937. It is found in Australia, where it has been recorded from Queensland.

References 

Tirathabini
Moths described in 1937